Nanzih Export Processing Zone Station is a station on the Red line of Kaohsiung MRT in Nanzih District, Kaohsiung, Taiwan.

The station is a three-level, elevated station with one island platforms and six exits. It is 170 meters long and is located on Jiachang Houchang Rd. in front of the Nanzih Export Processing Zone.

Around the Station
 Youchang Forest Park
 Nanzih Export Processing Zone
 Kaohsiung Refinery dormitory
 Jiachang Rd.

References

External links
KRTC Nanzih Export Processing Zone Station

2008 establishments in Taiwan
Kaohsiung Metro Red line stations
Railway stations opened in 2008